Bada Mahlera tehsil is a tehsil in Chhatarpur District, Madhya Pradesh, India. It is also a subdivision of the administrative and revenue division of Sagar district of Madhya Pradesh.

References 

Tehsils of Madhya Pradesh
Chhatarpur district